The Egypt men's national 3x3 team is a national basketball team of Egypt, governed by the Egyptian Basketball Federation. It represents the country in international 3x3 (3 against 3) basketball competitions.

World Cup record

See also
Egypt national basketball team

References

External links

Basketball in Egypt
Basketball teams in Egypt
Men's national 3x3 basketball teams
Basketball